The Manitoba Writers' Guild was inaugurated in August 1981 at Aubigny, Manitoba, as a grassroots organization for and of Manitoba writers. The Guild has grown from the twenty members who joined after that first meeting to a membership of over 600. The Manitoba Writers' Guild's primary aim is to promote and advance the art of writing, in all its forms, throughout Manitoba. Its official publication is a quarterly magazine called WordWrap.

The Guild organizes many events during the year (some of them jointly, with other organizations), including the 24-Hour Freedom to Read Marathon, Poetry in Motion and Manitoba Book Week events, Brave New Words: The Manitoba Writing and Publishing Awards (with McNally Robinson booksellers). They also administer the province's public readings program and otherwise offer several educational sessions for writers. As well, they run the Patricia Blondal Memorial Writers' Retreat near Gimli, Manitoba, every summer.

It also organizes the Manitoba Book Awards and the Sheldon Oberman Mentorship Program. 

The Manitoba Writers' Guild office is in the Artspace Building in the Exchange District in downtown Winnipeg, but in 2018 had to abandon most of its office space due to funding cuts.

References

External links
Manitoba Writers' Guild 

Organizations based in Winnipeg
Professional associations based in Manitoba
Canadian writers' organizations